Matthew Scott Long (born March 16, 1961) is a former American football center who played for the Philadelphia Eagles of the National Football League (NFL). He played college football at San Diego State University.

References 

1961 births
Living people
American football centers
San Diego State Aztecs football players
Philadelphia Eagles players